The Croatian Athletics Championships is an annual outdoor track and field competition organised by the Croatian Athletics Federation, which served as the national championship for the sport in Croatia. 

The event was first held in 1992 following the country's independence from SFR Yugoslavia. Prior to 1992 Croatian athletes participated in the Yugoslavian Athletics Championships.

Events
The competition programme features a total of 51 individual Yugoslavian Championship athletics events, 26 for men and 25 for women.

Track running
100 metres, 200 metres, 400 metres, 800 metres, 1500 metres, 3000 metres, 5000 metres, 10,000 metres
Road running
Half marathon, Marathon
Obstacle events
100 metres hurdles (women only), 110 metres hurdles (men only), 400 metres hurdles, 3000 metres steeplechase (men only)
Jumping events
Pole vault, high jump, long jump, triple jump
Throwing events
Shot put, discus throw, javelin throw, hammer throw
Combined events
Decathlon (men only), Heptathlon (women only)

Championships records

Men

Women

See also
List of Croatian Athletics Championships winners

References

Athletics competitions in Croatia
National athletics competitions
Recurring sporting events established in 1992
1992 establishments in Croatia